Mugsy is a strategy and management computer game for the 48K ZX Spectrum. It was well-received, mainly due to its innovative graphic style, and was followed two years later by a sequel.

Gameplay 
The player takes the role of "Mugsy", an American gangster. The aim of the game is for Mugsy to become "the most powerful gang leader in the city". In each 'turn' of the game, which represents one year, decisions must be made about how much money should be spent on weapons and ammunition to fight other gangs, how many business from which he should attempt to extract protection money, and how much bribery of local law enforcement should take place.

The game was marketed as an "interactive video comic strip"; it was highly visual, with graphics (produced using the software house's own title, Melbourne Draw) intended to be similar to comic book drawings. Information was presented to the player in the form of dialogue between on-screen characters, such as Mugsy himself, and an unnamed assistant. At each decision point, the player enters text into a 'speech bubble' dialogue box.

There was no real plot or narrative arc within the game as a whole; each year's activities were essentially the same, with the same decisions being required to be made by the player. However, there was a small arcade element, which was triggered in the event that one of Mugsy's rivals orders a contract killing on him. When this happened, the player controls Mugsy directly, and must shoot the assassins who are sent after him before Mugsy gets shot too many times himself.

Release
The title was heavily publicised in the year of its release, with at least 26 advertisements in the trade press, many of them 2-page spreads. The release of the game was preceded by a promotional campaign including actors dressed as gangsters visiting the offices of some computing magazines. It was originally released in 1984 in the UK, by Melbourne House. It was later re-released in Spain by Iveson Software SA. It was priced at £6.95 in the UK, and 1900 pesetas for the Spanish re-released version. In 1986, it was included in a compilation of titles called 'Off The Hook', aimed at raising money to combat drug addiction.

Reception 
Reviews of the Spectrum edition were very positive; Your Sinclair'''s "Joystick Jury" rated it a "hit", citing its impressive graphics, and a structure that, while logical, provided a high level of replayability, as each game ended differently. It was also the winner of a Crash Reader's Award for "Best Strategy and Simulation". The magazine commented positively on the graphics, partly because the visual style was "suited to a game set in the roaring twenties"; this was despite "Mugsy" having to take place before 1919, since that is when its sequel, Mugsy's Revenge, begins.

Legacy
A sequel, Mugsy's Revenge'' was published two years later, and ported to the Commodore 64 and Amstrad CPC.  Russel Comte, a leading member of the design team, went on to work as an artist on a number of other significant computer game titles.

References 

1984 video games
Business simulation games
Video games developed in the United Kingdom
ZX Spectrum games
ZX Spectrum-only games
Organized crime video games